Mariana Cifuentes (born 18 May 1987) is a retired Mexican synchronized swimmer. She competed in the women's duet at the 2008 Summer Olympics as well as three editions of the Central American and Caribbean Games, where she won a total of eight gold medals. She also took part in two Pan American Games and won the bronze medal in the 2014 FINA Synchronized Swimming World Cup in the Team Highlight event.  After a career of 18 years, she retired in 2015. She is part of the Sports Hall of Fame of the state of Jalisco, being admitted in 2018

References 

1987 births
Living people
Mexican synchronized swimmers
Olympic synchronized swimmers of Mexico
Synchronized swimmers at the 2008 Summer Olympics
Sportspeople from Guadalajara, Jalisco
Synchronized swimmers at the 2011 Pan American Games
Central American and Caribbean Games gold medalists for Mexico
Competitors at the 2006 Central American and Caribbean Games
Central American and Caribbean Games medalists in synchronized swimming
Pan American Games competitors for Mexico
20th-century Mexican women
21st-century Mexican women